The Norwegian Publishers' Association is a publishing house association in Norway.

It was established in 1895 by William Martin Nygaard as a sub-group of the Norwegian Booksellers Association. The two separated in 1956.

Its current chair is Tom Harald Jenssen, and managing director is Kristenn Einarsson.

References

External links  
 The Norwegian Publishers Association

Organizations established in 1895
1895 establishments in Norway
Organisations based in Oslo
Norwaco